The Zanzibar Utilities Regulatory Authority (ZURA) is a multisectoral government agency  established under Act No. 7/2013 of the Laws of Zanzibar to provide technical and economic regulation in both electricity, petroleum and water sectors in Zanzibar, autonomous part of Zanzibar Archipelago, Tanzania, East Africa.

History 
Zanzibar Utilities Regulatory Authority was established in 2015  in accordance with Act No. 7/2013 of the Laws of Zanzibar. The agency is governed by the board of directors while the day-to-day affairs are governed by the director general. ZURA regulates the utilities in various islands in Zanzibar. The man two Islands are Pemba Island and Unguja. To provide efficient and reliable services in the islands, a bill to regulate the energy and water sectors was drafted and enacted into law on 19 August 2013, creating a multi-sectoral independent regulatory authority to regulate electricity, petroleum, LPG, and water utility services. The electricity utility's main source of electricity is through a 39-kilometer of 100-megawatt submarine capacity cable originating from the mainland (Dar es Salaam to Ras Fumba) to Unguja. The Unguja highland is served by a 75-kilometre of 25-megawatt subsea capacity cable from the Tanzania mainland. In 2017 ZURA established a program to import petroleum in bulk to the islands.

Location 
The foundation for a new headquarters building for ZURA was laid in Maisara, Zanzibar, Tanzania in January 2019. The building opened in June 2020.

Governance

ZURA is composed of  seven board of directors including the director general who is an ex officio member. The Minister of Lands, Water, Energy and Environment  appoints five members while the director general and the chairperson of the board are presidential appointees. The board of directors is chaired by Asha Ali Abdula, who is also a member of the Energy Regulators Association of East Africa General Assembly. The director general of the authority is Bihindi Nassor Khatib.

Electricity and water markets
The Zanzibar's Island water coverage is  65% at an average of daily service of 12 hours and is managed by the Zanzibar Water Authority. The electricity access rate is 82% and the power supply is managed by the Zanzibar Electricity Corporation. The two utilities are regulated by the Zanzibar Utilities Regulatory Authority and the following electricity and water tariffs are applicable:

End User Electricity Tariff

End User Water Tariff

Auxiliary institutions and allied agencies 
 Tanzania Electric Supply Company Limited
 Zanzibar Electricity Corporation
 TANESCO

See also 
 Energy Regulators Association of East Africa
 2008 Zanzibar power blackout

References 

Electric power companies of Tanzania
Energy companies of Tanzania
Government-owned companies of Tanzania
Zanzibar
Energy companies established in 2015